Professor Nicholas Dixon Hastie (born 1947) CBE, FRS, FRSE is a British geneticist, and former Director of the MRC Human Genetics Unit at the University of Edinburgh.

Education
Hastie was educated at the University of Liverpool and the University of Cambridge.

Awards and honours
Hastie was elected a Fellow of the Royal Society in 2002. His nomination reads 

Hastie was also a member of the Faculty of 1000.

References

British geneticists
Commanders of the Order of the British Empire
Fellows of the Royal Society
Fellows of the Royal Society of Edinburgh
Living people
1947 births